Arlene Iradie Semeco Arismendi (born January 11, 1984) is a female freestyle swimmer from Venezuela, who represented her native country in three consecutive Summer Olympics, starting in 2004. She won two gold medals at the 2007 Pan American Games. She attended the University of Alabama.

See also
 Venezuelan records in swimming

References
 
 

1984 births
Living people
Venezuelan female freestyle swimmers
Venezuelan female swimmers
University of Alabama alumni
Swimmers at the 2003 Pan American Games
Swimmers at the 2004 Summer Olympics
Swimmers at the 2007 Pan American Games
Swimmers at the 2008 Summer Olympics
Swimmers at the 2011 Pan American Games
Swimmers at the 2012 Summer Olympics
Olympic swimmers of Venezuela
Sportspeople from Caracas
Swimmers at the 2015 Pan American Games
Pan American Games gold medalists for Venezuela
Pan American Games bronze medalists for Venezuela
Pan American Games medalists in swimming
Central American and Caribbean Games gold medalists for Venezuela
Central American and Caribbean Games bronze medalists for Venezuela
Competitors at the 2010 Central American and Caribbean Games
South American Games gold medalists for Venezuela
South American Games silver medalists for Venezuela
South American Games bronze medalists for Venezuela
South American Games medalists in swimming
Competitors at the 2002 South American Games
Competitors at the 2006 South American Games
Competitors at the 2010 South American Games
Competitors at the 2014 South American Games
Central American and Caribbean Games medalists in swimming
Medalists at the 2007 Pan American Games
Medalists at the 2011 Pan American Games
21st-century Venezuelan women